Adhoori Aurat (also known as "Adhuri Aurat")  is a Pakistani drama serial aired on Geo Entertainment. It was released on 16 April 2013, directed by Furqan Khan and written by Samina Ejaz. The serial features Faysal Qureshi, Ayeza Khan and Maheen Rizvi in lead roles.

Cast
 Faisal Qureshi as Zayan Ahmed
 Ayeza Khan as Maryam Aftab
 Maheen Rizvi as Faiza
 Kaif Ghaznavi as Afshan
 Tahira Imam as Nusrat
 Minal Khan as Arshiya
 Anwar Iqbal as Prof. Aftab
 Naima Khan as Tasneem
 Bilal Qureshi
 Aamir Qureshi as Afshan's husband
 Omer Shahzad
 Anum Aqeel
 Mumtaz Kanwal

Reception
It was very popular in the masses and was high in trps throughout its airing. Its average TRP is 4.5, which is high, as TRPs used to be low in 2013 and before summers, due to intense electricity loadshedding. All the actors were critically acclaimed for their stellar performances. Faysal Qureshi did his best to his negative role while Ayeza Khan won hearts for millions of people throughout the world for a positive heartwinning role.

Awards and nominations

References

External links
 Official website of the serial
 Adhoori Aurat at the Facebook

2013 Pakistani television series debuts
Geo TV original programming
Pakistani drama television series
Urdu-language television shows